Andrew Francis Scrivani (March 28, 1917 – June 1, 2015) was an American boxer who competed in the 1936 Summer Olympics. He was born in Chicago. In 1936 he was eliminated in the quarter-finals of the lightweight class after losing his fight to the upcoming bronze medalist Erik Ågren.

External links
Andy Scrivani's profile at Sports Reference.com

Andy Scrivani's obituary

1917 births
2015 deaths
American male boxers
Boxers at the 1936 Summer Olympics
Boxers from Chicago
Lightweight boxers
Olympic boxers of the United States